Cloyne is a small town in County Cork, Ireland. It may also refer to:

 Cloyne, a community in the township of Addington Highlands in Ontario, Canada.
 Cloyne Court Hotel (often referred to simply as Cloyne), a student housing cooperative in Berkeley, California, USA.
 Cloyne GAA, a Gaelic Athletic Association (GAA) club based in Cloyne, County Cork, Ireland.
 Roman Catholic Diocese of Cloyne
 Sexual abuse scandal in Cloyne diocese and resulting 2011 Cloyne Report
 The mythological name for an evil clown in the 2014 horror film Clown